Abu Hena Rony (also known as Dulabhai; born 14 December 1987) is a Bangladeshi stand-up comedian, actor, presenter and model. In 2011, he participated and won the Zee Bangla comedy show Mirakkel season 6 jointly with Vicky and Partha.

Primary life 
Rony was born on 14 December 1987 in village Bildahar of Chamari union under Natore district. His father, Abdul Latif is a retired school teacher and his mother, a housewife. Rony was the second child among the four brothers. He started his education at Akannabigha Primary School. After he became a science student by passing the JSC, he passed SSC from Bildahar High School and HSC from Barendra Government College. He completed graduation and post-graduation from the Department of Drama and Music under Rajshahi University.

Career

Comedian 
From childhood, Rony tried to give pleasure to his friends by presenting comedy. In July 2011, he participated in the comedy show "Mirakkel". He took part in the first 40 episodes of this event, and he got the first place in 75% of the episodes. Most of the participants called him Dulabhai as he was so good at comedy. Then, he became the champion of Mirakkel Akkel Challenger 6 along with Vicky and Partha.

Presenter 
Besides Comedy, he used to present different shows. In 2019, on NTV, he participated in the comedy show "Ha-Show" as a host firstly. Then, he used to host "Ajker Ananna" on GTV, "Comedy Hour" and "Cine Hour" on ATN Bangla, "Khude Roshikraj" and "Talk Misti Jhal" on Banglavision and "Jadur Shohor" on Boishakhi Television.

Actor 
He made his first debut in film by Swapno Je Tui. Then, he acted in the film Podmo Patar Jol directed by Tonmoy Tansen in 2015. The other film acted by him was Tom and Jerry. Later on, he started acting in television series like Kakatuar Deshe, Chatushkon etc.

Partial singer 
He had sung so many songs before presenting his jokes in Mirakkel. In 2018, a song "Beche Thakbo Jotodin, Bhalobasbo Totodin" was sang by him which was directed by Asad Sarkar and uploaded by YouTube channel "Bangla Moulik Gaan".

Published books 
After winning the champion's title in Mirakkel Akkel Challenger 6, his first book "Mirakkel Jokes Lau Thela" was published in Ekushey Book Fair. Then, in 2015, his second book "Ananda Tie Mati" was published. Other books by him were Khatii Bondhu, Hashir Patro, School of Comedy, Buddhir Proshno Mojar Uttor.

Awards 
 Champion of Mirakkel Akkel Challenger 6
 Viewer's Choice Award of Mirakkel Akkel Challenger 6

Controversy 
In 2017, PM Sheikh Hasina posted a picture of taking a stroll on the sea in Cox's Bazar, Rony put a mocking comment on her post. His post caused an outrage on the social media platform. Later on, he deleted the comment, facing public anger. Later, he got sued for derogatory comment on PM.

References

External links 
 
 

Living people
1987 births
Bangladeshi comedians
Male comedians
21st-century comedians
University of Rajshahi alumni